Pultenaea humilis, commonly known as dwarf bush-pea, is a species of flowering plant in the family Fabaceae and is endemic to south-eastern Australia. It is a spreading, often low-lying shrub with branches that are hairy when young, elliptic to lance-shaped leaves with the narrower end towards the base, and yellow to orange and red flowers.

Description
The edges of the leaves curve upwards and the upper surface is paler than the lower surface. The flowers are arranged singly in leaf axils in clusters near the ends of branches.

Taxonomy and naming
Pultenaea humilis was first formally described in 1856 by Joseph Dalton Hooker in The Botany of the Antarctic voyage of H.M. Discovery ships Erebus and Terror. III. Flora Tasmaniae, based on an unpublished description by George Bentham. The specific epithet (humilis) means "low" or "small".

Distribution and habitat
Dwarf bush-pea grows in heath, woodland and forest and is found in scattered populations on the south-western slopes of New South Wales, and the northern midlands of Tasmania. It is widespread and relatively common in central and western areas on and south of the Great Dividing Range in Victoria.

Conservation status
Pultenaea humilis is relatively common in Victoria, but is listed as "vulnerable" in New South Wales under the New South Wales Government Biodiversity Conservation Act and as "vulnerable" in Tasmania under the Tasmanian Government Threatened Species Protection Act 1995.

References

humilis
Flora of New South Wales
Flora of Victoria (Australia)
Flora of Tasmania
Plants described in 1856
Taxa named by Joseph Dalton Hooker